Sir William Middleton, 3rd Baronet (c. 1700–1757) of Belsay Castle, Bolam, Northumberland, was a British landowner and Whig politician who sat in the House of Commons for 35 years  from  1722 to 1757.

Early life and family
 Middleton was the eldest son of Sir John Middleton, 2nd Baronet and his wife Frances Lambert, daughter of John Lambert of Calton, Yorkshire, and grand daughter of the Cromwellian general John Lambert. The Middleton family lived at Belsay in Northumberland from the thirteenth century. Middleton succeeded to the estates and baronetcy on the death of his father on 17 October 1717. While he was a minor,  his chief trustee was the Presbyterian minister at Belsay. He owned a first-rate stud, bred from newly imported Arabian horses, and was a member of the Jockey Club.  According to family tradition Middleton ‘was always borrowing money and always in debt’ He married  Anne Ettrick, daughter of William Ettrick of Silksworth, county Durham in May 1725.

Career
The Middleton family had represented Northumberland in Parliament since early in the fifteenth century. When Middleton came of age, he was returned unopposed as a Whig Member of Parliament for Northumberland at the  1722 general election. As a Presbyterian, he attracted   the Presbyterian vote, of which the farmers made up a considerable part. He represented Northumberland  for the rest of his life, and usually supported the Government. He was returned unopposed again at the  1727 general election and in a note of dissent, voted against the government on      the Excise Bill of 1733. At the 1734 general election, there was a contest at Northumberland at enormous cost to the candidates, and Middleton's fellow candidate, Ralph Jenison, was financially crippled by it. In that parliament Middleton's dissent was expressed by a vote against the place bill of 1740. He was returned unopposed at the 1741 general election. In May 1742 under an opposition bill he was  chosen as one of the  commissioners of public accounts, but the bill was rejected in the House of Lords.

Middleton went with the Duke of Cumberland when he passed through Northumberland in January 1746 to assume command of the army in Scotland.  Although Middleton was a civilian he was made a colonel and placed on the Duke's staff.  At the  1747 and 1754 general elections, he was returned unopposed again for Northumberland. From 1754 was  receiving a secret service pension of £800 per annum.

Death and legacy
 Middleton died  on 28 September 1757. He and his wife had one daughter and no male heirs. The baronetcy passed to his brother John Lambert Middleton. After his death the entire contents of the house,  down to the pots and pans in the kitchen, were sold by auction to pay off his debts. The horses were also sold and Lord Rockingham bought Whistlejacket, one of his best horses.

References

1700s births
1757 deaths
British MPs 1722–1727
British MPs 1727–1734
British MPs 1734–1741
British MPs 1741–1747
British MPs 1747–1754
British MPs 1754–1761
Members of the Parliament of Great Britain for English constituencies
Baronets in the Baronetage of England